The canton of Ceor-Ségala is an administrative division of the Aveyron department, southern France. It was created at the French canton reorganisation which came into effect in March 2015. Its seat is in Baraqueville.

It consists of the following communes:
 
Baraqueville
Boussac
Cabanès
Camboulazet
Camjac
Castanet
Centrès
Colombiès
Gramond
Manhac
Meljac
Moyrazès
Naucelle
Pradinas
Quins
Saint-Just-sur-Viaur
Sauveterre-de-Rouergue
Tauriac-de-Naucelle

References

Cantons of Aveyron